Hotak v London Borough of Southwark is a 2015 judgment of the Supreme Court of the United Kingdom. It is a landmark judgment concerning homelessness law and concerned the meaning of vulnerability under s.189(1)(c) of Part VII of the Housing Act. Hokak overturned the R. v Camden LBC, ex p. Pereira case which introduced the so-called Pereira Test of vulnerability whereby it was judged against the ordinary homeless person.

See also
Gatekeeping (UK housing term)

References

Homelessness and law
Supreme Court of the United Kingdom cases